Chapman–Enskog theory provides a framework in which equations of hydrodynamics for a gas can be derived from the Boltzmann equation. The technique justifies the otherwise phenomenological constitutive relations appearing in hydrodynamical descriptions such as the Navier–Stokes equations.  In doing so, expressions for various transport coefficients such as thermal conductivity and viscosity are obtained in terms of molecular parameters. Thus, Chapman–Enskog theory constitutes an important step in the passage from a microscopic, particle-based description to a continuum hydrodynamical one.

The theory is named for Sydney Chapman and David Enskog, who introduced it independently in 1916 and 1917.

Description

The starting point of Chapman–Enskog theory is the Boltzmann equation for the 1-particle distribution function :

where  is a nonlinear integral operator which models the evolution of  under interparticle collisions. This nonlinearity makes solving the full Boltzmann equation difficult, and motivates the development of approximate techniques such as the one provided by Chapman–Enskog theory.

Given this starting point, the various assumptions underlying the Boltzmann equation carry over to Chapman–Enskog theory as well. The most basic of these requires a separation of scale between the collision duration  and the mean free time between collisions : . In addition to this assumption, Chapman–Enskog theory also requires that  is much smaller than any extrinsic timescales . These are the timescales associated with the terms on the left hand side of the Boltzmann equation, which describe variations of the gas state over macroscopic lengths. Typically, their values are determined by initial/boundary conditions and/or external fields. This separation of scales implies that the collisional term on the right hand side of the Boltzmann equation is much smaller than the streaming terms on the left hand side. Thus, an approximate solution can be found from

It can be shown that the solution to this equation is a Gaussian:

A gas is said to be in local equilibrium if it satisfies this equation. The primary goal of Chapman–Enskog theory is to systematically obtain generalizations of the Euler equations which incorporate dissipation. This is achieved by expressing deviations from local equilibrium as a perturbative series in Knudsen number , which is small if . Conceptually, the resulting hydrodynamic equations describe the dynamical interplay between free streaming and interparticle collisions. The latter tend to drive the gas towards local equilibrium, while the former acts across spatial inhomogeneities to drive the gas away from local equilibrium. When the Knudsen number is of the order of 1 or greater, the gas in the system being considered cannot be described as a fluid.

To first order in  one obtains the Navier–Stokes equations. Second and third orders give rise, respectively, to the Burnett equations and super-Burnett equations.

Mathematical formulation
Since the Knudsen number does not appear explicitly in the Boltzmann equation, but rather implicitly in terms of the distribution function and boundary conditions, a dummy variable  is introduced to keep track of the appropriate orders in the Chapman–Enskog expansion:

Small  implies the collisional term  dominates the streaming term , which is the same as saying the Knudsen number is small. Thus, the appropriate form for the Chapman–Enskog expansion is

Solutions that can be formally expanded in this way are known as normal solutions to the Boltzmann equation. This class of solutions excludes non-perturbative contributions (such as ), which appear in boundary layers or near internal shock layers. Thus, Chapman–Enskog theory is restricted to situations in which such solutions are negligible.

Substituting this expansion and equating orders of  leads to the hierarchy

The solution to the first equation is a Gaussian:

The expression for  suggests a connection between these functions and the physical hydrodynamic fields defined as moments of :

One of the key simplifying assumptions of Chapman–Enskog theory is to assume that these otherwise arbitrary functions can be written in terms of the exact hydrodynamic fields and their spatial gradients. In other words, the space and time dependence of  enters only implicitly through the hydrodynamic fields. This statement is physically plausible because small Knudsen numbers correspond to the hydrodynamic regime, in which the state of the gas is determined solely by the hydrodynamic fields.

While these assumptions are physically plausible, there is the question of whether solutions which satisfy these properties actually exist. More precisely, one must show that solutions exist satisfying

One of the key technical achievements of Chapman–Enskog theory is to answer both of these questions in the positive. Thus, at least at the formal level, there is no loss of generality in the Chapman–Enskog approach. 

With these formal considerations established, one can proceed to calculate . The result is

where  is a vector and  a tensor, each a solution of a linear inhomogeneous integral equation that can be solved explicitly by a polynomial expansion. Here, the colon denotes the double dot product,  for tensors , .

Predictions

To first order in the Knudsen number, the heat flux  is found to obey Fourier's law of heat conduction,

and the momentum-flux tensor  is that of a Newtonian fluid,

with  the identity tensor.

With these results, it is straightforward to obtain the Navier–Stokes equations.

 

As in the previous section the colon denotes the double dot product, .

Comparison with experiment

An important prediction of Chapman–Enskog theory is that viscosity is independent of density (this can be seen for each molecular model in table 1, but is actually model-independent). This counterintuitive result traces back to James Clerk Maxwell, who inferred it in 1860 on the basis of more elementary kinetic arguments. It is well-verified experimentally for gases at ordinary densities. 

On the other hand, the theory predicts that  does depend on temperature. For more complex gases the agreement is not as good, most likely due to the neglect of attractive forces. Indeed, the Lennard-Jones model, which does incorporate attractions, can be brought into closer agreement with experiment (albeit at the cost of a more opaque  dependence; see the Lennard-Jones entry in table 1). 

For instance, rigid elastic spheres have , and molecules with repulsive force  have  (the latter deviation is ignored in table 1). The special case of Maxwell molecules (repulsive force ) has   exactly. Table 2 shows that there is reasonable agreement between theory and experiment.

Extensions

The basic principles of Chapman–Enskog theory can be extended to more diverse physical models, including gas mixtures and molecules with internal degrees of freedom. In the high-density regime, the theory can be adapted to account for collisional transport of momentum and energy, i.e. transport over a molecular diameter during a collision, rather than over a mean free path (in between collisions). Including this mechanism predicts a density dependence of the viscosity at high enough density, which is also observed experimentally.

One can also carry out the theory to higher order in the Knudsen number. In particular, the second-order contribution  has been calculated by Burnett. In general circumstances, however, these higher-order corrections may not give reliable improvements to the first-order theory, due to the fact that the Chapman–Enskog expansion does not always converge. (On the other hand, the expansion is thought to be at least asymptotic to solutions of the Boltzmann equation, in which case truncating at low order still gives accurate results.) Even if the higher order corrections do afford improvement in a given system, the interpretation of the corresponding hydrodynamical equations is still debated.

See also
 Transport phenomena
 Kinetic theory of gases
 Boltzmann equation
 Navier–Stokes equations
 Viscosity
 Thermal conductivity

Notes

References

The classic monograph on the topic:

 

Contains a technical introduction to normal solutions of the Boltzmann equation:

 

Statistical mechanics